Angelo Mozzillo (24 October 1736 in Afragola – May 1810, in Nola) was an Italian painter of the late Baroque, active near Naples, Italy.

He initially trained with a Giuseppe Bonito (Peppariello). After 1758, he left Afragola and moved to Nola. He then moved to study in the Academy of Fine Arts of Naples under Giuseppe Bonito and Paolo de Maio. In Nola, he painted several painting: an Immaculate Conception for the Cappella Nuova; a San Nicola di Bari, and a St Francesco di Paola. He also painted for the church of San Raffaele, Naples.

References

1736 births
Year of death unknown
18th-century Italian painters
Italian male painters
Rococo painters
Painters from Naples
18th-century Italian male artists